Hosseinabad (also Romanized as Ḩosseinābād) is a village in Miyan Kaleh Rural District, in the Central District of Behshahr County, Mazandaran Province, Iran. At the 2006 census, its population was 2,661, in 692 families.

References 

Populated places in Behshahr County